Mimi Majumder is an Indian politician belonging to Bharatiya Janata Party. She was elected as MLA of Badharghat Vidhan Sabha Constituency in Tripura Legislative Assembly on 27 September 2019.

References

Living people
Bharatiya Janata Party politicians from Tripura
Tripura MLAs 2018–2023
Women members of the Tripura Legislative Assembly
Year of birth missing (living people)
21st-century Indian women politicians